"Chuck Versus Tom Sawyer" is the fifth episode of the second season of Chuck. It originally aired on October 27, 2008. Life in espionage takes its toll on Chuck Bartowski and everyone is taking notice. Chuck tries to explain his unusual behavior to Ellie Bartowski and to the quirky Buy More efficiency expert Emmett Milbarge (Tony Hale), but a new assignment only complicates things. After a global terrorist comes searching for Jeff Barnes, Chuck is forced to socialize with Jeff in order to find out what role the oddball plays in the mission.

Plot
In 1983, Jeff Barnes wins the Missile Command World Championship in San Fernando Valley, California. In the present, Chuck Bartowski arrives late to the Buy More and Morgan Grimes warns him about the new efficiency expert. As Chuck meets Emmett Milbarge (Tony Hale), he flashes on a tough-looking bald man (Faran Tahir). Feigning sickness, Chuck tries to slink away but runs into the man, who shows him a picture of Jeff from 1983 and asks Chuck if he knows him. Chuck says no and suggests that he check the other thirteen Southern California Buy Mores.

John Casey identifies the man as Farrokh Bulsara, a global terrorist. Chuck's assignment is to approach Jeff socially to find out why a terrorist is tracking him; the other option is to grab Jeff and have a federal team interrogate him. Ellie Bartowski stops by the Orange Orange and talks to Sarah Walker about Chuck. When told that Chuck may be spending time out with "Nerd Herd, creepy, serial killer Jeff", Ellie says they really need to talk.

Chuck approaches Jeff, but is interrupted by Emmett. After a brief talk about Emmett's love life, Chuck ducks out of an interview, postponing it to the next day. Chuck catches up with Jeff and asks him out for a beer, which Jeff declines in favor of a dozen beers. Instead of going to Jeff's house, they agree to meet at the Buy More.

Jeff presents his music video of Anna Wu as the night's entertainment. Chuck then asks Jeff about the man who was looking for him. Jeff thinks it is one of his fans and reveals a video to Chuck that he has not shown to anyone else, a 25-year-old news video of Jeff being declared the Missile Command world champion. Chuck flashes on the man awarding the trophy and prizes, Mr. Morimoto (Clyde Kusatsu). While Chuck and Jeff watch the video, a van of terrorists pulls up to Buy More, which Casey notices on the Castle monitors and goes to the Buy More to warn Chuck about. After Jeff passes out, Chuck is forced to carry him out the back door.

Back at Buy More, Sarah takes Chuck away before Morgan and Lester Patel can announce that they have become best friends as a form of retaliation. It is revealed that Morimoto, the designer of Missile Command, worked for the Japanese military and was in the command of actual missiles, loaded into a satellite that is laying dormant in orbit. Chuck is able to attack Atari headquarters with a computer virus as a cover for Team Bartowski to gain access to Morimoto. Chuck and Casey are not successful trying to enter as computer experts in headquarters full of computer experts. Sarah, however, is a much more successful distraction and Chuck and Casey run up the stairs. Chuck encounters Bulsara and gets locked in a room. In the room, Morimoto plays Missile Command while listening to the Rush song "Tom Sawyer", and it is revealed that he hid secret codes to the satellite on the arcade game's kill screen. Morimoto claims that the complex equations to progress to the kill screen are based on the "music of the universe." Casey breaks in and wonders why Morimoto is still playing when Bulsara has the code. It is then revealed that a bomb has been wired to the game console, and Morimoto urges them to run before it explodes. Chuck refuses to leave him behind, but Casey does not give him a choice. They escapes before the bomb explodes, incinerating Morimoto.

At Castle, General Beckman realizes that the satellite must be shot down. Chuck proposes the alternate plan of having Jeff play Missile Command to the kill screen, which Jeff agrees to, in exchange for grape cough syrup, M&M's not colored brown, his lucky game console, Anna wearing a grass skirt, and the attendance of his fans. Casey argues that Jeff's fans have already moved on, but when word spreads about Jeff, his fans immediately flock to the Burbank Buy More to see him win the game.

While the media covers the event, Chuck notices some static on a television and flashes on a local news station, where Bulsara plans to control the satellite. Sarah goes to the news station as Casey prepares to order that the satellite be shot down. Jeff prepares to play to the kill screen, but collapses under the pressure. Chuck attempts to win the game, but fails. He then flashes on a bystander's Rush jacket, and the Intersect correlates Rush music to the game. Chuck remembers Morimoto's words about the "music of the universe" being the key to win and realizes that the mathematical pattern underlying the game is the same as the song "Tom Sawyer". Morgan plays the song, and Chuck achieves 2,000,000 points and is able to play to the kill screen in front of the crowd.

Sarah finds and defeats the terrorists at the local television station and gains control of the satellite controls. When Chuck unlocks the kill screen and reveals the access codes, he relays them to Sarah, who controls the satellite and averts World War III. Later, Jeff walks up for one more round of Missile Command.

Moving on
When Chuck is awakened by his alarm clock, he is still wearing the last night's name tag and clothes. As he rushes to exit the apartment, Ellie and Devon urge him to not miss breakfast, offering a ginseng protein shake. Ellie notes how later Chuck came home the night before, which Chuck explains as playing video games. Devon asked what happened to all of Chuck's big plans, and Ellie adds that Chuck should be moving on.

When told by Sarah that Chuck may be spending time with Jeff, Ellie says they really need to talk. They meet Ellie at the apartment and Ellie worries that Chuck is slipping back to old self, having no confidence and no direction, mentioning that he was only twelve course credits short of graduating from Stanford University when he was expelled. Sarah insists that, as with a duck, "Sometimes it seems like [Chuck] is just gliding along, but beneath the surface his little feet are just paddling away like crazy," and that deep down Chuck is mature and responsible. Just then, Chuck bursts in carrying the drunken Jeff, who wakes in the morning and scares Ellie. As Chuck hurries him to a waiting cab, Ellie tells Chuck he should go back to school. Chuck responds he still has all the goals he used to have.

When Chuck returns home after winning Missile Command, Ellie presents him with an electrical engineering diploma from Stanford, which Sarah and Casey arranged for based on Chuck's "practical studies". Chuck thanks Sarah for the thought and the fake diploma but she tells him it is real, earned from all of his field work with the CIA. They share a romantic moment wishing on a shooting star, or the weapons satellite burning up in the atmosphere (see Main plot).

Buy More
Big Mike reveals that it is time for things to get moving at the Buy More. Emmett Milbarge is introduced as an efficiency expert sent by Buy More corporate. Emmett announces that he will be interviewing the employees and evaluating their performance, "perhaps even trimming the fat". The interviews go poorly as Emmett writes his impressions such as "untrainable" and "prostitute?" in large, red letters across the evaluation forms. All employees answer that the one who holds everything together is Chuck.

Chuck arrives late to work and Morgan warns him about Emmett. As Chuck meets Emmett, he flashes on a tough-looking bald man and feigns sickness to slink away. Emmett later interrupts Chuck for another interview, but, after a brief talk about Emmett's love life, Chuck ducks out of the interview, postponing it to the next day.

Later that night, Emmett records his findings of the branch by saying there is "no sign of intelligent life." He observes Chuck pounding a beer, recording various accusations.

After the rally (see Main plot), Big Mike congratulates Chuck and announces that Emmett will be staying as assistant manager.

Production
This episode marked the introduction of Tony Hale in his recurring role of Emmett Milbarge.

Flashes
 Chuck flashes on Bulsara.
 Chuck flashes on Morimoto in Jeff's video tape.
 Chuck notices static on a television and flashes on a local news station where Farrokh plans to control the satellite.
 Chuck flashes on a bystander's Rush jacket, correlating the song "Tom Sawyer" to Missile Command.

Cultural references

 Jeff Barnes' flashback is a parody of Jeff Spicoli's (Sean Penn) dream sequence in Fast Times at Ridgemont High. Visually nearly identical, the scenes share several lines, and both Jeffs are flanked by models. A fictional "Stu Brewster" (Bill Lewis) substitutes for the late Stu Nahan (himself) from the film; Jeff's statement to the Missile Command console at the end of the episode, "Hey bud, let's party," is also taken from Spicoli. Additionally, that film closed on close-up of Missile Command’s "The End" screen; the same close-up is featured when Chuck first attempts to beat the game.
 Chuck pretends not to recognize Jeff's photograph, asking Farrokh Bulsara if Jeff is a "Sweathog", one of the remedial student characters of Welcome Back, Kotter.
 "Farrokh Bulsara" is the birth name of Queen vocalist Freddie Mercury.
 The episode's title references the song "Tom Sawyer" by Canadian band Rush, which itself is named after Mark Twain's popular novel The Adventures of Tom Sawyer.
 The game Missile Command is also prominently featured. In the Chuck universe, Morimoto is the game's designer, likely a reference to Nintendo video game designer Shigeru Miyamoto.
 When Morgan offers his Zune, Chuck asks "You have a Zune?", to which Morgan replies, "Are you kidding me? No, I'll grab my iPod."
 The episode has also been compared to The King of Kong: A Fistful of Quarters.
 The name "Emmett Milbarge" is a reference to the comedy Spies Like Us, combining the names of Chevy Chase's character Emmett Fitz-Hume and Dan Aykroyd's character Austin Milbarge. 
 When Jeff agrees to play Missile Command, he asks for provisions, including "a bag of M&M's without the browns". This stems from the story that, during the 1980s, the band Van Halen had a contract rider for concert appearances, requiring bowls of M&M's backstage without the brown ones. Although a lot of people took this as a rock star eccentricity, it was a 'tell-tale' to readily see if every detail on their contract was thoroughly complied with.

Critical response
"Chuck Versus Tom Sawyer" received positive reviews from critics. Eric Goldman of IGN gave this episode a score of 9.3 out of 10, writing, "This was perhaps the geekiest episode of Chuck yet – and certainly the one that anyone who grew up in the 80s will most appreciate. It was one of those installments that worked to bring Chuck's spy life and Buy More life together in a major way, and did so in an incredibly funny and entertaining manner." Goldman also praised Hale's addition Chuck'''s recurring cast, writing, "The always awesome Hale is another great addition to a show that's really delivering these days."

Steve Heisler of The A.V. Club gave the episode an A-, writing "Clearly, Chuck is about nerds. But there's a danger to that as well. When the show tries to prove its "nerds are cool" message, it comes off as disengaged... But as was evident even from moment one of season two, the show is trending in a much more exciting direction: This is now a show about nerds, for nerds, doing all it can to embrace things nerds find cool. And thus Chuck'' no longer feels like a defense of the culture, but a celebration of it.
" Unlike Goldman, Heisler found Hale's performance "lacking".

Viewer response was also  positive, with an 8.5/10 user rating at TV.com. The episode drew 6.698 million viewers.

References

External links
 

Tom Sawyer
2008 American television episodes